Athletic Hassi Messaoud is an Algerian football club based in Hassi Messaoud, Ouargla. The club currently plays in the Centre Ouest group of the Inter-Régions Division.

References

Football clubs in Algeria
Ouargla Province
Sports clubs in Algeria